Tsubasa Bridge, also known as Neak Loeung Bridge, links Kandal Province with the town of Neak Loeung, Prey Veng Province in Cambodia, on the heavily travelled Highway 1 between Phnom Penh, and Ho Chi Minh City in Vietnam.

Construction 
This 2.2 km cable-stayed bridge eliminated a ferry crossing and is the longest bridge across the Mekong River in Cambodia, 300 metres longer than its nearest rival, the Koh Kong Bridge. The project includes the main cable-stayed section totalling 640m, two composite girder approach sections of 900m and 675m, and approach embankments totalling 3.1 km.

The inauguration ceremony to begin construction occurred on February 12, 2011. The bridge opened to traffic in April 2015.  It was funded and built by a Japanese government donation (Cambodia's third Japanese donated bridge) and its image appears on the new 500 riel note. The bridge is part of a larger programme of works to improve connectivity along Asian Highway 1 from Thailand to Vietnam.

Images

References

External links

Bridges over the Mekong River
Cable-stayed bridges
Road bridges in Cambodia
Buildings and structures in Kandal province
Buildings and structures in Prey Veng province
Bridges completed in 2015
2015 establishments in Cambodia
Cambodia–Japan relations